Leighton W. Abel (February 22, 1900 – April 23, 1975) was an American politician and businessman.

Born in Monona, Iowa, Abel owned the Abel Shoe Company in Guttenberg, Iowa. He was also involved with the insurance business, He served in the Iowa House of Representatives from 1951 to 1955 and was a Republican. Abel then served as a lobbyist and also served as secretary of the Iowa Commerce Commission. Abel died at a hospital in Guttenberg, Iowa.

Notes

External links

1900 births
1975 deaths
People from Clayton County, Iowa
Businesspeople from Iowa
Republican Party members of the Iowa House of Representatives
20th-century American politicians
20th-century American businesspeople